Meilahti (in Swedish Mejlans) is a neighbourhood of Helsinki between Mannerheimintie (the main entrance road to Helsinki) and a bay named Seurasaarenselkä. Most of the houses in Meilahti were built in the 1930s and 1940s. Meilahti is home to over 6700 people. Meilahti is the location of Mäntyniemi, official residence of the President of Finland, as well as Kesäranta, the official residence of Prime Minister of Finland. Near Mäntyniemi is the former presidential residence, Tamminiemi, which is today a museum dedicated to president Urho Kekkonen.

Several hospitals are located in this district, including the Meilahti Hospital of the Helsinki University Central Hospital (HUCH).

Neighbourhoods surrounding Meilahti are Töölö, Munkkiniemi, Ruskeasuo, Pikku Huopalahti and Laakso.

For the 1952 Summer Olympics, the neighborhood hosted the rowing events.

References
1952 Summer Olympics official report. pp. 54–55.

 
Venues of the 1952 Summer Olympics
Olympic rowing venues